Summadevi is a village located near Palasa in Srikakulam district, Andhra Pradesh, India. It is located on north east direction from Palasa town near National Highway-5 and Howrah-Chennai main railway line.
Summadevi is having Summadevi railway station. Trains that run from towards Khruda Road, halt at Summadevi station.

References

Villages in Srikakulam district